Censorship is the suppression of speech, public communication, or other information. This may be done on the basis that such material is considered objectionable, harmful, sensitive, or "inconvenient". Censorship can be conducted by governments, private institutions and other controlling bodies.

Governments and private organizations may engage in censorship. Other groups or institutions may propose and petition for censorship. When an individual such as an author or other creator engages in censorship of his or her own works or speech, it is referred to as self-censorship.   General censorship occurs in a variety of different media, including speech, books, music, films, and other arts, the press, radio, television, and the Internet for a variety of claimed reasons including national security, to control obscenity, pornography, and hate speech, to protect children or other vulnerable groups, to promote or restrict political or religious views, and to prevent slander and libel.

Direct censorship may or may not be legal, depending on the type, location, and content. Many countries provide strong protections against censorship by law, but none of these protections are absolute and frequently a claim of necessity to balance conflicting rights is made, in order to determine what could and could not be censored. There are no laws against self-censorship.

History

In 399 BC, Greek philosopher, Socrates, while defying attempts by the Athenian state to censor his philosophical teachings, was accused of collateral charges related to the corruption of Athenian youth and sentenced to death by drinking a poison, hemlock.

The details of Socrates's conviction are recorded by Plato as follows. In 399 BC, Socrates went on trial and was subsequently found guilty of both corrupting the minds of the youth of Athens and of impiety (asebeia, "not believing in the gods of the state"), and as a punishment sentenced to death, caused by the drinking of a mixture containing hemlock.

Socrates' student, Plato, is said to have advocated censorship in his essay on The Republic, which opposed the existence of democracy. In contrast to Plato, Greek playwright Euripides (480–406 BC) defended the true liberty of freeborn men, including the right to speak freely. In 1766, Sweden became the first country to abolish censorship by law.

Rationale and criticism
Censorship has been criticized throughout history for being unfair and hindering progress. In a 1997 essay on Internet censorship, social commentator Michael Landier claims that censorship is counterproductive as it prevents the censored topic from being discussed. Landier expands his argument by claiming that those who impose censorship must consider what they censor to be true, as individuals believing themselves to be correct would welcome the opportunity to disprove those with opposing views.

Censorship is often used to impose moral values on society, as in the censorship of material considered obscene. English novelist E. M. Forster was a staunch opponent of censoring material on the grounds that it was obscene or immoral, raising the issue of moral subjectivity and the constant changing of moral values. When the 1928 novel Lady Chatterley's Lover was put on trial in 1960, Forster wrote:

Proponents have sought to justify it using different rationales for various types of information censored:
 Moral censorship is the removal of materials that are obscene or otherwise considered morally questionable. Pornography, for example, is often censored under this rationale, especially child pornography, which is illegal and censored in most jurisdictions in the world.
 Military censorship is the process of keeping military intelligence and tactics confidential and away from the enemy. This is used to counter espionage.
 Political censorship occurs when governments hold back information from their citizens. This is often done to exert control over the populace and prevent free expression that might foment rebellion.
 Religious censorship is the means by which any material considered objectionable by a certain religion is removed. This often involves a dominant religion forcing limitations on less prevalent ones. Alternatively, one religion may shun the works of another when they believe the content is not appropriate for their religion.
 Corporate censorship is the process by which editors in corporate media outlets intervene to disrupt the publishing of information that portrays their business or business partners in a negative light, or intervene to prevent alternate offers from reaching public exposure.

Types

Political

State secrets and prevention of attention

In wartime, explicit censorship is carried out with the intent of preventing the release of information that might be useful to an enemy. Typically it involves keeping times or locations secret, or delaying the release of information (e.g., an operational objective) until it is of no possible use to enemy forces. The moral issues here are often seen as somewhat different, as the proponents of this form of censorship argues that release of tactical information usually presents a greater risk of casualties among one's own forces and could possibly lead to loss of the overall conflict.

During World War I letters written by British soldiers would have to go through censorship. This consisted of officers going through letters with a black marker and crossing out anything which might compromise operational secrecy before the letter was sent. The World War II catchphrase "Loose lips sink ships" was used as a common justification to exercise official wartime censorship and encourage individual restraint when sharing potentially sensitive information.

An example of "sanitization" policies comes from the USSR under Joseph Stalin, where publicly used photographs were often altered to remove people whom Stalin had condemned to execution. Though past photographs may have been remembered or kept, this deliberate and systematic alteration to all of history in the public mind is seen as one of the central themes of Stalinism and totalitarianism.

Censorship is occasionally carried out to aid authorities or to protect an individual, as with some kidnappings when attention and media coverage of the victim can sometimes be seen as unhelpful.

Religion

Censorship by religion is a form of censorship where freedom of expression is controlled or limited using religious authority or on the basis of the teachings of the religion. This form of censorship has a long history and is practiced in many societies and by many religions. Examples include the Galileo affair, Edict of Compiègne, the Index Librorum Prohibitorum (list of prohibited books) and the condemnation of Salman Rushdie's novel The Satanic Verses by Iranian leader Ayatollah Ruhollah Khomeini. Images of the Islamic figure Muhammad are also regularly censored. In some secular countries, this is sometimes done to prevent hurting religious sentiments.

Educational sources

The content of school textbooks is often an issue of debate, since their target audiences are young people. The term whitewashing is commonly used to refer to revisionism aimed at glossing over difficult or questionable historical events, or a biased presentation thereof. The reporting of military atrocities in history is extremely controversial, as in the case of The Holocaust (or Holocaust denial), Bombing of Dresden, the Nanking Massacre as found with Japanese history textbook controversies, the Armenian genocide, the Tiananmen Square protests of 1989, and the Winter Soldier Investigation of the Vietnam War.

In the context of secondary school education, the way facts and history are presented greatly influences the interpretation of contemporary thought, opinion and socialization. One argument for censoring the type of information disseminated is based on the inappropriate quality of such material for the younger public. The use of the "inappropriate" distinction is in itself controversial, as it changed heavily. A Ballantine Books version of the book Fahrenheit 451 which is the version used by most school classes contained approximately 75 separate edits, omissions, and changes from the original Bradbury manuscript.

In February 2006, a National Geographic cover was censored by the Nashravaran Journalistic Institute. The offending cover was about the subject of love and a picture of an embracing couple was hidden beneath a white sticker.

Economic induced censorship 
Economic induced censorship is a type of censorship enacted by economic markets to favor, and disregard, types of information. Economic induced censorship, is also caused, by market forces which privatize and establish commodification of certain information that is not accessible by the general public, primarily because of the cost associated with commodified information such as academic journals, industry reports and pay to use repositories.

The concept was illustrated as a censorship pyramid that was conceptualized by primarily Julian Assange, along with Andy Müller-Maguhn, Jacob Appelbaum and Jérémie Zimmermann, in the Cypherpunks (book).

Self-censorship

Self-censorship is the act of censoring or classifying one's own discourse. This is done out of fear of, or deference to, the sensibilities or preferences (actual or perceived) of others and without overt pressure from any specific party or institution of authority. Self-censorship is often practiced by film producers, film directors, publishers, news anchors, journalists, musicians, and other kinds of authors including individuals who use social media.

According to a Pew Research Center and the Columbia Journalism Review survey, "About one-quarter of the local and national journalists say they have purposely avoided newsworthy stories, while nearly as many acknowledge they have softened the tone of stories to benefit the interests of their news organizations. Fully four-in-ten (41%) admit they have engaged in either or both of these practices."

Threats to media freedom have shown a significant increase in Europe in recent years, according to a study published in April 2017 by the Council of Europe.
This results in a fear of physical or psychological violence, and the ultimate result is self-censorship by journalists.

Copy, picture, and writer approval
Copy approval is the right to read and amend an article, usually an interview, before publication. Many publications refuse to give copy approval but it is increasingly becoming common practice when dealing with publicity anxious celebrities. Picture approval is the right given to an individual to choose which photos will be published and which will not. Robert Redford is well known for insisting upon picture approval. Writer approval is when writers are chosen based on whether they will write flattering articles or not. Hollywood publicist Pat Kingsley is known for banning certain writers who wrote undesirably about one of her clients from interviewing any of her other clients.

Reverse censorship
Flooding the public, often through online social networks, with false or misleading information is sometimes called "reverse censorship". American legal scholar Tim Wu has explained that this type of information control, sometimes by state actors, can "distort or drown out disfavored speech through the creation and dissemination of fake news, the payment of fake commentators, and the deployment of propaganda robots."

By media

Books

Book censorship can be enacted at the national or sub-national level, and can carry legal penalties for their infraction. Books may also be challenged at a local, community level. As a result, books can be removed from schools or libraries, although these bans do not typically extend outside of that area.

Films

Aside from the usual justifications of pornography and obscenity, some films are censored due to changing racial attitudes or political correctness in order to avoid ethnic stereotyping and/or ethnic offense despite its historical or artistic value. One example is the still withdrawn "Censored Eleven" series of animated cartoons, which may have been innocent then, but are "incorrect" now.

Film censorship is carried out by various countries. Film censorship is achieved by censoring the producer or restricting a state citizen. For example, in China the film industry censors LGBT related films. Filmmakers must resort in finding funds within international investors such as the “Ford Foundations” and or produce through an independent film company.

Music

Music censorship has been implemented by states, religions, educational systems, families, retailers and lobbying groups – and in most cases they violate international conventions of human rights.

Maps

Censorship of maps is often employed for military purposes. For example, the technique was used in former East Germany, especially for the areas near the border to West Germany in order to make attempts of defection more difficult. Censorship of maps is also applied by Google Maps, where certain areas are grayed out or blacked or areas are purposely left outdated with old imagery.

Art
Art is loved and feared because of its evocative power. Destroying or oppressing art can potentially justify its meaning even more.

British photographer and visual artist Graham Ovenden's photos and paintings were ordered to be destroyed by a London's magistrate court in 2015 for being "indecent" and their copies had been removed from the online Tate gallery.

A 1980 Israeli law forbade banned artwork composed of the four colours of the Palestinian flag, and Palestinians were arrested for displaying such artwork or even for carrying sliced melons with the same pattern.

Moath al-Alwi is a Guantanamo Bay prisoner who creates model ships as an expression of art. Alwi does so with the few tools he has at his disposal such as dental floss and shampoo bottles, and he is also allowed to use a small pair of scissors with rounded edges. A few of Alwi's pieces are on display at John Jay College of Criminal Justice in New York. There are also other artworks on display at the College that were created by other inmates. The artwork that is being displayed might be the only way for some of the inmates to communicate with the outside. Recently things have changed though. The military has come up with a new policy that won't allow the artwork at Guantanamo Bay Military Prison to leave the prison. The art work created by Alwi and other prisoners is now government property and can be destroyed or disposed of in whatever way the government choose, making it no longer the artist's property.

Around 300 artists in Cuba are fighting for their artistic freedom due to new censorship rules Cuba's government has in place for artists. In December 2018, following the introduction of new rules that would ban music performances and artwork not authorized by the state, performance artist Tania Bruguera was detained upon arriving to Havana and released after four days.

An example of extreme state censorship was the Nazis requirements of using art as propaganda. Art was only allowed to be used as a political instrument to control people and failure to act in accordance with the censors was punishable by law, even fatal. The Degenerate Art Exhibition is a historical instance that's goal was to advertise Nazi values and slander others.

Internet

Internet censorship is control or suppression of the publishing or accessing of information on the Internet. It may be carried out by governments or by private organizations either at the behest of government or on their own initiative. Individuals and organizations may engage in self-censorship on their own or due to intimidation and fear.

The issues associated with Internet censorship are similar to those for offline censorship of more traditional media. One difference is that national borders are more permeable online: residents of a country that bans certain information can find it on websites hosted outside the country. Thus censors must work to prevent access to information even though they lack physical or legal control over the websites themselves. This in turn requires the use of technical censorship methods that are unique to the Internet, such as site blocking and content filtering.

Furthermore, the Domain Name System (DNS) a critical component of the Internet is dominated by centralized and few entities. The most widely used DNS root is administered by the Internet Corporation for Assigned Names and Numbers (ICANN). As an administrator they have rights to shut down and seize domain names when they deem necessary to do so and at most times the direction is from governments. This has been the case with Wikileaks shutdowns and name seizure events such as the ones executed by the National Intellectual Property Rights Coordination Center (IPR Center) managed by the Homeland Security Investigations (HSI). This makes it easy for internet censorship by authorities as they have control over what should or should not be on the Internet. Some activists and researchers have started opting for alternative DNS roots, though the Internet Architecture Board (IAB) does not support these DNS root providers.

Unless the censor has total control over all Internet-connected computers, such as in North Korea or Cuba, total censorship of information is very difficult or impossible to achieve due to the underlying distributed technology of the Internet. Pseudonymity and data havens (such as Freenet) protect free speech using technologies that guarantee material cannot be removed and prevents the identification of authors. Technologically savvy users can often find ways to access blocked content. Nevertheless, blocking remains an effective means of limiting access to sensitive information for most users when censors, such as those in China, are able to devote significant resources to building and maintaining a comprehensive censorship system.

Views about the feasibility and effectiveness of Internet censorship have evolved in parallel with the development of the Internet and censorship technologies:
 A 1993 Time magazine article quotes computer scientist John Gillmore, one of the founders of the Electronic Frontier Foundation, as saying "The Net interprets censorship as damage and routes around it."
 In November 2007, "Father of the Internet" Vint Cerf stated that he sees government control of the Internet failing because the Web is almost entirely privately owned.
 A report of research conducted in 2007 and published in 2009 by the Beckman Center for Internet & Society at Harvard University stated that: "We are confident that the [censorship circumvention] tool developers will for the most part keep ahead of the governments' blocking efforts", but also that "...we believe that less than two percent of all filtered Internet users use circumvention tools".
 In contrast, a 2011 report by researchers at the Oxford Internet Institute published by UNESCO concludes "... the control of information on the Internet and Web is certainly feasible, and technological advances do not therefore guarantee greater freedom of speech."

A BBC World Service poll of 27,973 adults in 26 countries, including 14,306 Internet users, was conducted between 30 November 2009 and 7 February 2010. The head of the polling organization felt, overall, that the poll showed that:
Despite worries about privacy and fraud, people around the world see access to the internet as their fundamental right. They think the web is a force for good, and most don't want governments to regulate it.

The poll found that nearly four in five (78%) Internet users felt that the Internet had brought them greater freedom, that most Internet users (53%) felt that "the internet should never be regulated by any level of government anywhere", and almost four in five Internet users and non-users around the world felt that access to the Internet was a fundamental right (50% strongly agreed, 29% somewhat agreed, 9% somewhat disagreed, 6% strongly disagreed, and 6% gave no opinion).

Social media
The rising usages of social media in many nations has led to the emergence of citizens organizing protests through social media, sometimes called "Twitter Revolutions". The most notable of these social media led protests were parts Arab Spring uprisings, starting in 2010. In response to the use of social media in these protests, the Tunisian government began a hack of Tunisian citizens' Facebook accounts, and reports arose of accounts being deleted.

Automated systems can be used to censor social media posts, and therefore limit what citizens can say online. This most notably occurs in China, where social media posts are automatically censored depending on content. In 2013, Harvard political science professor Gary King led a study to determine what caused social media posts to be censored and found that posts mentioning the government were not more or less likely to be deleted if they were supportive or critical of the government. Posts mentioning collective action were more likely to be deleted than those that had not mentioned collective action. Currently, social media censorship appears primarily as a way to restrict Internet users' ability to organize protests.  For the Chinese government, seeing citizens unhappy with local governance is beneficial as state and national leaders can replace unpopular officials. King and his researchers were able to predict when certain officials would be removed based on the number of unfavorable social media posts.

Research has proved that criticism is tolerable on social media sites, therefore it is not censored unless it has a higher chance of collective action. It isn't important whether the criticism is supportive or unsupportive of the states' leaders, the main priority of censoring certain social media posts is to make sure that no big actions are being made due to something that was said on the internet. Posts that challenge the Party's political leading role in the Chinese government are more likely to be censored due to the challenges it poses to the Chinese Communist Party.

In December 2022 Elon Musk, owner and CEO of Twitter released internal documents from the social media microblogging site to journalists Matt Taibbi, Michael Shellenberger and Bari Weiss. The analysis of these files on Twitter, collectively called, the Twitter Files, explored the content moderation and visibility filtering carried out in collaboration with the Federal Bureau of Investigation on the Hunter Biden laptop controversy.

On the platform TikTok, certain hashtags have been categorized by the platform's code and determines how viewers can or cannot interact with the content or hashtag specifically. Some shadowbanned tags include: #acab, #GayArab, #gej due to their referencing of certain social movements and LGBTQ identity. As TikTok guidelines are becoming more localized around the world, some experts believe that this could result in more censorship than before.

Video games

Since the early 1980s, advocates of video games have emphasized their use as an expressive medium, arguing for their protection under the laws governing freedom of speech and also as an educational tool. Detractors argue that video games are harmful and therefore should be subject to legislative oversight and restrictions. Many video games have certain elements removed or edited due to regional rating standards.
For example, in the Japanese and PAL Versions of No More Heroes, blood splatter and gore is removed from the gameplay. Decapitation scenes are implied, but not shown. Scenes of missing body parts after having been cut off, are replaced with the same scene, but showing the body parts fully intact.

Impact of surveillance

Surveillance and censorship are different. Surveillance can be performed without censorship, but it is harder to engage in censorship without some form of surveillance. Even when surveillance does not lead directly to censorship, the widespread knowledge or belief that a person, their computer, or their use of the Internet is under surveillance can have a "chilling effect" and lead to self-censorship.

Implementation

The former Soviet Union maintained a particularly extensive program of state-imposed censorship. The main organ for official censorship in the Soviet Union was the Chief Agency for Protection of Military and State Secrets generally known as the Glavlit, its Russian acronym. The Glavlit handled censorship matters arising from domestic writings of just about any kindeven beer and vodka labels. Glavlit censorship personnel were present in every large Soviet publishing house or newspaper; the agency employed some 70,000 censors to review information before it was disseminated by publishing houses, editorial offices, and broadcasting studios. No mass medium escaped Glavlits control. All press agencies and radio and television stations had Glavlit representatives on their editorial staffs.

Sometimes, public knowledge of the existence of a specific document is subtly suppressed, a situation resembling censorship. The authorities taking such action will justify it by declaring the work to be "subversive" or "inconvenient". An example is Michel Foucault's 1978 text Sexual Morality and the Law (later republished as The Danger of Child Sexuality), originally published as La loi de la pudeur [literally, "the law of decency"]. This work defends the decriminalization of statutory rape and the abolition of age of consent laws.

When a publisher comes under pressure to suppress a book, but has already entered into a contract with the author, they will sometimes effectively censor the book by deliberately ordering a small print run and making minimal, if any, attempts to publicize it. This practice became known in the early 2000s as privishing (private publishing). an OpenNet Initiative (ONI) classifications:

By country

Censorship for individual countries is measured by Freedom House (FH) Freedom of the Press report, Reporters Without Borders (RWB) Press freedom index and V-Dem  government censorship effort index. Censorship aspects are measured by Freedom on the Net and OpenNet Initiative (ONI) classifications. Censorship by country collects information on censorship, internet censorship, press freedom, freedom of speech, and human rights by country and presents it in a sortable table, together with links to articles with more information. In addition to countries, the table includes information on former countries, disputed countries, political sub-units within countries, and regional organizations.

Canada

Very little is formally censored in Canada, aside from "obscenity" (as defined in the landmark criminal case of R v Butler) which is generally limited to pornography and child pornography depicting and/or advocating non-consensual sex, sexual violence, degradation, or dehumanization, in particular that which causes harm (as in R v Labaye).  Most films are simply subject to classification by the British Columbia Film Classification Office under the non-profit Crown corporation by the name of Consumer Protection BC, whose classifications are officially used by the provinces of British Columbia, Saskatchewan, Ontario, and Manitoba.

Cuba 

Cuban media used to be operated under the supervision of the Communist Party's Department of Revolutionary Orientation, which "develops and coordinates propaganda strategies". Connection to the Internet is restricted and censored.

China 

The People's Republic of China employs sophisticated censorship mechanisms, referred to as the Golden Shield Project, to monitor the internet. Popular search engines such as Baidu also remove politically sensitive search results.

Eastern Bloc 

Strict censorship existed in the Eastern Bloc. Throughout the bloc, the various ministries of culture held a tight rein on their writers. Cultural products there reflected the propaganda needs of the state. Party-approved censors exercised strict control in the early years. In the Stalinist period, even the weather forecasts were changed if they suggested that the sun might not shine on May Day. Under Nicolae Ceauşescu in Romania, weather reports were doctored so that the temperatures were not seen to rise above or fall below the levels which dictated that work must stop.

Possession and use of copying machines was tightly controlled in order to hinder production and distribution of samizdat, illegal self-published books and magazines.  Possession of even a single samizdat manuscript such as a book by Andrei Sinyavsky was a serious crime which might involve a visit from the KGB. Another outlet for works which did not find favor with the authorities was publishing abroad.

France

Amid declining car sales in 2020, France banned a television ad by a Dutch bike company, saying the ad "unfairly discredited the automobile industry".

India

The Constitution of India guarantees freedom of expression, but places certain restrictions on content, with a view towards maintaining communal and religious harmony, given the history of communal tension in the nation. According to the Information Technology Rules 2011, objectionable content includes anything that "threatens the unity, integrity, defence, security or sovereignty of India, friendly relations with foreign states or public order". Notably many pornographic websites are blocked in India.

Iran

Iraq 
Iraq under Baathist Saddam Hussein had much the same techniques of press censorship as did Romania under Nicolae Ceauşescu but with greater potential violence.

Japan

During the GHQ occupation of Japan after WW2, any criticism of the Allies' pre-war policies, the SCAP, the Far East Military Tribunal, the inquiries against the United States and every direct and indirect references to the role played by the Allied High Command in drafting Japan's new constitution or to censorship of publications, movies, newspapers and magazines was subject to massive censorship, purges, media blackout.

In the four years (September 1945-November 1949) since the CCD was active, 200 million mails, 136 million telegrams were opened, and telephones were tapped 800,000 times. 
Since no criticism of the occupying forces for crimes such as the dropping of the atomic bomb, rape and robbery by US soldiers was allowed, a strict check was carried out. Those who got caught were put on a blacklist called the watchlist, and the persons and the organizations to which they belonged were investigated in detail, which made it easier to dismiss or arrest the "disturbing molecule".

Malaysia
Under subsection 48(3) and (4) of the Penang Islamic Religious Administration Enactment 2004, non-Muslims in Malaysia are penalized for using the following words, or to write or publish them, in any form, version or translation in any language or for use in any publicity material in any medium:
"Allah", "Firman Allah", "Ulama", "Hadith", "Ibadah", "Kaabah", "Qadhi'", "Illahi", "Wahyu", "Mubaligh", "Syariah", "Qiblat", "Haji", "Mufti", "Rasul", "Iman", "Dakwah", "Wali", "Fatwa", "Imam", "Nabi", "Sheikh", "Khutbah", "Tabligh", "Akhirat", "Azan", "Al Quran", "As Sunnah", "Auliya'", "Karamah", "False Moon God", "Syahadah", "Baitullah", "Musolla", "Zakat Fitrah", "Hajjah", "Taqwa" and "Soleh".

North Korea

Serbia 

According to Christian Mihr, executive director of Reporters Without Borders, "censorship in Serbia is neither direct nor transparent, but is easy to prove."  According to Mihr there are numerous examples of censorship and self-censorship in Serbia  According to Mihr, Serbian prime minister Aleksandar Vučić  has proved "very sensitive to criticism, even on critical questions," as was the case with Natalija Miletic, correspondent for Deutsche Welle Radio, who questioned him in Berlin about the media situation in Serbia and about allegations that some ministers in the Serbian government had plagiarized their diplomas, and who later received threats and offensive articles on the Serbian press.

Multiple news outlets have accused Vučić of anti-democratic strongman tendencies. In July 2014, journalists associations were concerned about the freedom of the media in Serbia, in which Vučić came under criticism.

In September 2015 five members of United States Congress (Edie Bernice Johnson, Carlos Curbelo, Scott Perry, Adam Kinzinger, and Zoe Lofgren) have informed Vice President of the United States Joseph Biden that Aleksandar's brother, Andrej Vučić, is leading a group responsible for deteriorating media freedom in Serbia.

Singapore

In the Republic of Singapore, Section 33 of the Films Act originally banned the making, distribution and exhibition of "party political films", at pain of a fine not exceeding $100,000 or to imprisonment for a term not exceeding 2 years. The Act further defines a "party political film" as any film or video

(a) which is an advertisement made by or on behalf of any political party in Singapore or any body whose objects relate wholly or mainly to politics in Singapore, or any branch of such party or body; or
(b) which is made by any person and directed towards any political end in Singapore

In 2001, the short documentary called A Vision of Persistence on opposition politician J. B. Jeyaretnam was also banned for being a "party political film". The makers of the documentary, all lecturers at the Ngee Ann Polytechnic, later submitted written apologies and withdrew the documentary from being screened at the 2001 Singapore International Film Festival in April, having been told they could be charged in court. Another short documentary called Singapore Rebel by Martyn See, which documented Singapore Democratic Party leader Dr Chee Soon Juan's acts of civil disobedience, was banned from the 2005 Singapore International Film Festival on the same grounds and See is being investigated for possible violations of the Films Act.

This law, however, is often disregarded when such political films are made supporting the ruling People's Action Party (PAP). Channel NewsAsia's five-part documentary series on Singapore's PAP ministers in 2005, for example, was not considered a party political film.

Exceptions are also made when political films are made concerning political parties of other nations. Films such as Michael Moore's 2004 documentary Fahrenheit 911 are thus allowed to screen regardless of the law.

Since March 2009, the Films Act has been amended to allow party political films as long as they were deemed factual and objective by a consultative committee. Some months later, this committee lifted the ban on Singapore Rebel.

Soviet Union 

Independent journalism did not exist in the Soviet Union until Mikhail Gorbachev became its leader; all reporting was directed by the Communist Party or related organizations. Pravda, the predominant newspaper in the Soviet Union, had a monopoly. Foreign newspapers were available only if they were published by communist parties sympathetic to the Soviet Union.

Spain

Turkey

Online access to all language versions of Wikipedia was blocked in Turkey on 29 April 2017 by Erdoğan's government.

United Kingdom

United States
In the United States, censorship occurs through books, film festivals, politics, and public schools. See banned books for more information.  Additionally, critics of campaign finance reform in the United States say this reform imposes widespread restrictions on political speech.

Uruguay 
In 1973, a military coup took power in Uruguay, and the State practiced censorship. For example, writer Eduardo Galeano was imprisoned and later was forced to flee. His book Open Veins of Latin America was banned by the right-wing military government, not only in Uruguay, but also in Chile and Argentina.

See also

Related articles
 
 
 Cancel culture
 
 
 
 
 
 
 
 
 
 
 , an organisation campaigning for freedom of expression, produces an award-winning quarterly magazine of the same name
 
 Laws against Holocaust denial
 
 
 
 
 
 
 
 
 
 
 
 
 
 
 Streisand effect
Freedoms

References

Works cited

Further reading

 Abbott, Randy. "A Critical Analysis of the Library-Related Literature Concerning Censorship in Public Libraries and Public School Libraries in the United States During the 1980s." Project for degree of Education Specialist, University of South Florida, December 1987.
 Biltereyst, Daniel, ed. Silencing Cinema. Palgrave/Macmillan, 2013.* Birmingham, Kevin, The Most Dangerous Book: The Battle for James Joyce's Ulysses, London (Head of Zeus Ltd), 2014, 
 Burress, Lee. Battle of the Books. Metuchen, NJ: The Scarecrow Press, 1989.
 Butler, Judith, "Excitable Speech: A Politics of the Performative"(1997).
 Darnton, Robert, 
 Demm, Eberhard. Censorship and Propaganda in World War I: A Comprehensive History (Bloomsbury Academic, 2019) online review
 Foucault, Michel, edited by Lawrence D. Kritzman. Philosophy, Culture: Interviews and Other Writings 1977–1984 (New York/London: 1988, Routledge) (The text Sexual Morality and the Law is Chapter 16 of the book).
 Gilbert, Nora. Better Left Unsaid: Victorian Novels, Hays Code Films, and the Benefits of Censorship. Stanford, CA: Stanford University Press, 2013.
 Hoffman, Frank. Intellectual Freedom and Censorship. Metuchen, NJ: The Scarecrow Press, 1989.
 Mathiesen, Kay Censorship and Access to Information Handbook of Information and Computer Ethics, Kenneth E. Himma, Herman T. Tavani, eds., John Wiley and Sons, New York, 2008
 National Coalition against Censorship (NCAC). "Books on Trial: A Survey of Recent Cases." January 1985.
 Parker, Alison M. (1997). Purifying America: Women, Cultural Reform, and Pro-Censorship Activism, 1873–1933, University of Illinois Press.
 Ringmar, Erik A Blogger's Manifesto: Free Speech and Censorship in the Age of the Internet (London: Anthem Press, 2007)
 Terry, John David II. "Censorship: Post Pico." In School Law Update, 1986, edited by Thomas N. Jones and Darel P. Semler.
 
 Silber, Radomír. Partisan Media and Modern Censorship: Media Influence On Czech Political Partisanship and the Media's Creation of Limits to Public Opposition and Control of Exercising Power in the Czech Republic in the 1990s. First edition. Brno: Tribun EU, 2017. 86 stran. Librix.eu. .
 Silber, Radomír. (2018) On Modern Censorship in Public Service Broadcasting. Cultural and Religious Studies, Volume 3, 2018, .
 Wittern-Keller, Laura. Freedom of the Screen: Legal Challenges to State Film Censorship, 1915–1981. University Press of Kentucky 2008

 
Anti-intellectualism
Historical negationism
Propaganda techniques